The 1920 Lebanese legislative speaker election was the first legislative speaker election.

The 17 members of the Administrative Committee of Greater Lebanon elected Daoud Amoun as speaker of the committee.

References 

Legislative speaker elections in Lebanon
Lebanon
October 1920 events
1920 in Lebanon